Nahum David Norbert Buch (23 November 1932 – 7 November 2022) was an Israeli Olympic swimmer.

Swimming career
Buch participated in swimming in the 1950 Maccabiah Games, where he shared the Best Athlete Award.

Buch competed for Israel at the 1952 Summer Olympics in Helsinki at the age of 19 in Swimming--Men's 100 metre Freestyle.  He came in 7th in his heat in the first round, with a time of 1:05.6. Buch was the first swimmer to represent Israel at the Olympics.

Later in his life Buch coached the Israeli national swimming team for a number of years.

In 2019 he was recognized for his contribution to swimming by young Australian Jewish swimmers.

References

External links
 

1932 births
2022 deaths
Olympic swimmers of Israel
Swimmers at the 1952 Summer Olympics
Israeli male freestyle swimmers
Maccabiah Games competitors for Israel
Maccabiah Games swimmers